Kamenicë is a community in Korçë County, southeastern Albania. At the 2015 local government reform it became part of the municipality Korçë.

References

Populated places in Korçë
Villages in Korçë County